This is a list of museums in Brunei.
 Brunei Museum 
 Malay Technology Museum
 Brunei Darussalam Maritime Museum
 Royal Regalia Museum
 Bubungan Dua Belas
 Belait District Museum
 Brunei Energy Hub
 Brunei History Centre
 Seria Energy Lab
 The Sports Gallery
 Police Museum Gallery
 Royal Brunei Armed forces Museum
 Kota Batu Archeological Park
 Islamic Calligraphy And Art Study Centre

See also 

 Lists of museums
 List of archives in Brunei
 List of libraries in Brunei

External links 	

Museums
 
Museums
Brunei
Brunei